Beach Read is a 2020 contemporary romance novel by Emily Henry. An audiobook was released by Penguin Random House Audio.

Synopsis 
January Andrews is a successful romance novel writer who is struggling after the death of her father and the discovery that he was having an affair. While living in his old beach house to prepare to sell it, she runs into Augustus Everett, her former rival in college and now an acclaimed literary fiction author. They reconnect and bond over struggling with writer’s block; they challenge each other to spend the summer writing a novel in each other’s genres.

Reception 

Beach Read was a New York Times Bestseller. It was listed in the Indie Next List for June 2020 and chosen as one of The Oprah Magazine’s 38 Romance Novels That Are Set to Be the Best of 2020. PopSugar named it the Best Romance Book of 2020. The novel was nominated for the Goodreads Choice Award for Best Romance, coming in second place.

Kirkus Reviews called Beach Read a "heartfelt look at taking second chances, in life and in love." A Publishers Weekly review said "Readers are sure to fall hard for this meta, heartfelt take on the romance genre."

References 

2020 American novels
American romance novels
Contemporary romance novels
Berkley Books books